Idina Kim Menzel (born May 30, 1971) is an American actress and singer. Particularly known for her work in musicals on the Broadway stage and having achieved mainstream success across stage, film and music, Menzel has garnered the honorific title "Queen of Broadway" for her achievements. Her accolades include an American Music Award, a Billboard Music Award, a Disney Legends Award, and a Tony Award, as well as nominations for three Drama League Awards and four Drama Desk Awards. In 2019, she was awarded a star on the Hollywood Walk of Fame for her contributions to live theatre.

Menzel rose to prominence as a stage actress in 1996, making her Broadway debut playing Maureen Johnson in the rock musical Rent, which earned her a Tony Award nomination for Best Featured Actress in a Musical. After appearing in several smaller-scale stage and Off-Broadway productions, in 2003 Menzel originated the role of Elphaba in the Broadway musical Wicked, for which she won the Tony Award for Best Actress in a Musical. The popularity of the musical, Menzel's character and song "Defying Gravity" earned her a devoted following among theater fans. After leaving the show in 2005, she reprised the role in the musical's original West End production until the end of 2006, becoming the highest-paid actress in West End theatre history. In 2014, Menzel returned to Broadway as Elizabeth Vaughan in the musical If/Then, for which she received a third Tony Award nomination. 

Menzel began transitioning to film and television roles in the early 2000s. After reprising her role as Maureen in Rent's 2005 film adaptation, she was cast as Nancy Tremaine in Disney's musical fantasy film Enchanted (2007) and reprised her role in its sequel Disenchanted (2022). She had a recurring role as Shelby Corcoran on the musical television series Glee (2010–2013). Since 2013, Menzel has voiced Elsa in Disney's computer-animated Frozen franchise. "Let It Go", a song she recorded for the first film, became widely popular upon release, winning an Academy Award for Best Original Song and reaching number five on the Billboard Hot 100, making her the first Tony Award-winning actor to have a top-10 song on the chart. Menzel also starred in the crime drama film Uncut Gems (2019) and in the jukebox musical film Cinderella (2021).  

As a recording artist, Menzel has released six studio albums: Still I Can't Be Still (1998), Here (2004), I Stand (2008), Holiday Wishes (2014), idina. (2016), and Christmas: A Season of Love (2019).

Early life and education 

Idina Kim Mentzel was born on May 30, 1971, in Manhattan. She grew up in New Jersey until about age three, when her family moved to Syosset, New York, on Long Island. Her parents are Stuart Mentzel, a pajama salesman, and Helene Goldberg, a therapist. She has a younger sister named Cara. Menzel is Jewish, and her grandparents emigrated from Ukrainian Haisyn. Menzel attended J. Irving Baylis Elementary School in Plainview, New York, and then Syosset's H. B. Thompson Middle School and Syosset High School.

When Menzel was 15 years old, her parents divorced and she began working as a wedding and bar/bat mitzvah singer, a job that she continued throughout her time at New York University's Tisch School of the Arts, where she earned a Bachelor of Fine Arts degree in drama in 1992.

Idina changed the spelling of her surname to "Menzel" to better reflect the pronunciation that the Mentzel family had adopted in the United States. She was friends with actor Adam Pascal before they worked together in Rent.

In 2017, during an interview with Irish New York–based songwriter Jimmy Walsh, he revealed that, in 1992, Menzel recorded a demo for him of the song "In Your Eyes", which went on to win the Eurovision Song Contest 1993 for Irish singer Niamh Kavanagh. Menzel was paid $75 for the recording.

Career

Theater career

Rent to The Wild Party (1996–2000) 
In 1995, Menzel auditioned for Rent, which became her first professional theatre job and her Broadway debut. Rent opened Off-Broadway at the New York Theatre Workshop on January 26, 1996, but it moved to Broadway's Nederlander Theatre due to its popularity. For her performance as Maureen Johnson in the original cast of the musical, Menzel received a Tony nomination as Best Featured Actress in a Musical losing to Ann Duquesnay for Bring in 'da Noise, Bring in 'da Funk. Her final performance in the musical was on July 1, 1997. Despite her breakout performance in Rent, Menzel did not experience the immediate success she was expecting, claiming she subsequently faded into "obscurity" for the following eight years.

Following the success of Rent, Menzel released her first solo album entitled Still I Can't Be Still on Hollywood Records. Menzel also originated the role of Dorothy in Summer of '42 at Goodspeed Opera House in Connecticut, starred as Sheila in the New York City Center Encores! production of Hair and appeared on Broadway as Amneris in Aida. Menzel earned a Drama Desk Award nomination for her performance as Kate in the Manhattan Theatre Club's 2000 Off-Broadway production of Andrew Lippa's The Wild Party. Her other Off-Broadway credits include the pre-Broadway run of Rent and The Vagina Monologues.

Wicked, If/Then, Skintight, to WILD (2003–2021) 

In 2003, Menzel starred alongside Kristin Chenoweth on Broadway in Wicked, a musical by Stephen Schwartz and Winnie Holzman based upon Gregory Maguire's 1995 novel Wicked: The Life and Times of the Wicked Witch of the West. Shortly after a San Francisco try-out, Wicked began previews on October 8, 2003, with an official opening night on October 30. Menzel's performance as Elphaba, the misunderstood Wicked Witch of the West, garnered critical acclaim, for which she won the 2004 Tony Award for Best Leading Actress in a Musical. Menzel's character also earned her a devoted fanbase, particularly among young girls who empathized with her misunderstood character, as well as a gay following. She can be heard on the show's Original Broadway Cast (OBC) recording. During her penultimate performance on January 8, 2005, she fell through a trap door during the melting scene and cracked a lower rib. This injury prevented her from performing in her final show on January 9. Menzel did, however, make a special appearance, in a red tracksuit, at that performance, performed her last song, and received a five-minute standing ovation. Menzel was replaced by Elphaba standby Shoshana Bean. In 2010, Broadway.com readers voted Menzel their favourite Elphaba performer out of the then-eleven actresses who had played the character on Broadway.

Following Wicked, Menzel appeared Off-Broadway in the Public Theater's production of See What I Wanna See, a Michael John LaChiusa-penned musical whose run ended in December 2005, for which she received Drama Desk Award and Drama League Award nominations. She reprised her Tony Award-winning role as Elphaba in the West End production of Wicked when it opened at London's Apollo Victoria Theatre on September 27, 2006. She starred alongside Helen Dallimore as Glinda and Adam Garcia as Fiyero. During her run, she was the highest-paid female performer in the West End at $30,000 per week. Menzel finished her West End run on December 30, 2006. She was succeeded by Elphaba standby Kerry Ellis.

Menzel played the role of Florence in the 21st-anniversary concert of the musical Chess at London's Royal Albert Hall, from May 12 to 13, 2008, alongside Kerry Ellis, Adam Pascal, and Josh Groban. In 2008, she headlined the Powerhouse Theatre's reading of Steven Sater and Duncan Sheik's musical Nero from July 11 to 13, performing the role of Nero's mistress, Poppea. She was joined by Glee costar Lea Michele as Claudia Octavia, Jeffrey Carleson as Nero, and Michael Arden as Octavia's brother, Brittanicus.

By February 28, 2013, Menzel was cast to star as Elizabeth in the new Tom Kitt and Brian Yorkey Broadway musical If/Then. Directed by Michael Greif (whom Menzel previously worked within the original production of Rent), it had its world premiere at the National Theatre in Washington, D.C., starting with previews on November 5, 2013, until November 24, 2013. Following the out-of-town tryout, the show moved to the Richard Rodgers Theatre on Broadway and began previews on March 4, 2014. It officially opened on March 30, 2014. For her performance, Menzel received her second Tony Award nomination for Best Leading Actress in a Musical and performed Always Starting Over, but lost to Jessie Mueller for Beautiful: The Carole King Musical. If/Then closed on Broadway on March 22, 2015, after 29 previews and 401 regular performances.

Menzel reprised the role of Elizabeth (along with original Broadway cast members Lachanze, James Snyder, and Anthony Rapp) on the first seven stops of the show's national tour from October 2015 to January 2016. She departed the show (along with LaChanze and Snyder) on the last day of the Costa Mesa, California engagement, on January 24, 2016. Her replacement was Jackie Burns (who previously served as Menzel's standby in the Broadway production) starting January 27, 2016, in Dallas, Texas.

Later, in 2018, Menzel was cast as Jodi in Roundabout Theatre Company's World Premiere production of Joshua Harmon's new play Skintight. The show premiered Off Broadway at the Laura Pels Theatre at the Harold and Miriam Steinberg Center for Theatre. It began previews on May 31, 2018, opened on June 21, 2018, and ran for strictly limited engagement till August 26, 2018. The play earned Menzel rave reviews and marking it her first major New York Theater non-musical role. A year later, she reprised her performance in Skintight marking its debut on the West Coast. The production played the Geffen Playhouse in Los Angeles, California running from September 3 – October 6, 2019.

While appearing in Skintight, Menzel read for the role of Mary Jane in a workshop for the Broadway rock musical Jagged Little Pill.

In late 2019, Menzel revealed on Twitter that she was working on "a mystery project" with Justin Tranter, Caroline Pennell and Eve Ensler (later known as V). In mid-2021, it was announced that this project is Wild: A Musical Becoming, set to perform at American Repertory Theater in Cambridge, MA from December 3, 2021, to January 21, 2022 (she was only scheduled to perform through December 23). It was later announced that she would star as Bea, with contributions to the lyrics. On December 17, due to COVID, it was announced that the show on that day was cancelled;
 it was later announced that the performance on the following two days and eventually all the following productions are cancelled, making December 16 her last performance.

Music career 
Menzel initially struggled to crossover into a solo music career beyond stage musicals, claiming the industry did not take her seriously as a pop or rock singer due to her Broadway origins. Menzel performed at the 1998 Lilith Fair summer concert festival and continues to write and perform original music. She has toured extensively and frequently performs in various venues throughout New York City. She produced and released her debut album, Still I Can't Be Still, for Hollywood Records in 1998. One single from the album, "Minuet," made the Radio & Records CHR/Pop Tracks chart at number 48 in October 1998. Following the album release, she embarked on a promotional tour, but after selling fewer than 10,000 copies in the US and missing the Billboard 200, Menzel's label put the album out of print, and she was dropped from the label. However, the album was re-released once she began to rise to greater fame with her Tony-winning performance in Wicked.

Her second album, Here, was released independently by Zel Records in 2004. Menzel contributed to the soundtrack of Desperate Housewives in 2005. She also appears on Ray Charles's album Genius and Friends, which was also released in 2005, on the track "I Will Be There." In 2007, she appeared on the Beowulf soundtrack singing the end credits song, "A Hero Comes Home." Also, in 2007, Menzel's powerful singing voice led her to be asked to accompany the baritone British X Factor runner-up, Rhydian Roberts, on his debut album, duetting on the song "What If".

Her third solo album, I Stand, was released on January 29, 2008. It includes many new songs, including the lead single, "Brave", the title track "I Stand," and a song released on EP, "Gorgeous." The album debuted at number 58 on the Billboard 200, making it the first solo album by Menzel to make the charts. There are five versions of this album: the original version, the special limited edition, the iTunes version, the Barnes & Noble edition, and the Borders edition. Menzel wrote 9 of the 10 songs on her album, with the song "Forever" writing only by herself.

On April 1, 2008, Menzel kicked off her 2008–2009 I Stand tour in support of her new album performing four sold-out legs. The concert at Rose Hall at Lincoln Center in New York City was filmed for the PBS television series Soundstage. Menzel was joined by special guests, superstar Josh Groban and saxophonist Ravi Coltrane.

On November 11, 2008, Menzel released "Hope," written by Paul Hampton, benefiting Stand Up to Cancer. On November 27, 2008, she performed "I Stand" on the M&M's Chocolate float as part of the Macy's Thanksgiving Day Parade.

On July 19, 2010, Menzel performed "Defying Gravity" and "What I Did For Love" in front of President Barack Obama and First Lady Michelle Obama at A Broadway Celebration: In Performance at the White House. The concert aired on PBS on October 20, 2010.

In April 2010, Menzel returned to the concert stage embarking on her "Barefoot at the Symphony Tour" in which she was accompanied by major symphony orchestras. Her performances included collaborations with the New York Philharmonic, the Boston Pops Orchestra, and the North Carolina Symphony, and featured symphonic arrangements by New York composer and producer Rob Mounsey. In October 2011, Menzel returned to London to perform a one-night-only concert in the United Kingdom at the Royal Albert Hall with the Royal Philharmonic Orchestra with Marvin Hamlisch conducting. Menzel's concert stop in Toronto was filmed at The Royal Conservatory of Music on November 17 and 18, 2011, for her second PBS special. She was accompanied by the Kitchener-Waterloo Symphony with Marvin Hamlisch conducting and special guest Taye Diggs, Menzel's then-husband. Idina Menzel Live: Barefoot at the Symphony was released as a live CD and DVD and aired on PBS in March 2012, with Musical Director Rob Mounsey producing.

Menzel announced she would continue live performances in 2012. The first date she announced was July 8, 2012, at Ravinia Festival near Chicago, Illinois. She made her Carnegie Hall solo debut (originally on October 29, 2012). However, due to Hurricane Sandy's impact on New York City, it was postponed until January 13, 2013.

Menzel toured Australia in June 2013 with shows in South Australia, Melbourne, Brisbane, and two at the Sydney Opera House.

On June 17, 2014, during a concert at New York City's Radio City Music Hall, Menzel confirmed that she was working on a Christmas album that would contain original material to be released later that same year. In that concert, she performed one of the original tunes from the album, "December Prayer". The album, Holiday Wishes, was released on October 14, 2014. The album has so far peaked at number 10 on the Billboard 200, becoming her highest-charting album as a solo lead artist. Holiday Wishes also marked the first that a woman had three different albums (along with the cast recording to Frozen and If/Then) peak within the top 20 within ten months of the release date. Holiday Wishes also become the second-ever Christmas album to chart before Halloween during the SoundScan Era after Garth Brooks's 1992 album Beyond the Season. On November 26, 2014, Menzel announced through her Facebook page that she would be touring during the summer of 2015, making it her first global tour and first time playing shows in Europe and Asia.

Menzel was honored with the Breakthrough Artist award at the 2014 Billboard Women in Music awards ceremony.

Menzel sang "The Star-Spangled Banner" a cappella at Super Bowl XLIX on February 1, 2015. Menzel's rendition earned mixed reviews from critics, who praised the quality of her voice but questioned some of her stylistic choices, namely tempo and volume. In a complementary review, Markos Papadatos of The Digital Journal felt Menzel redeemed her reputation as a strong vocalist after pundits had criticized her live performance of "Let it Go" at Dick Clark's New Year's Rockin' Eve the previous year.

On August 5, 2016, Menzel announced she would release her eponymous fifth album, on September 23. Of the release, Menzel stated: "I poured my heart out and used my music as a place to kind of figure some things out. It's a really personal album." Marking it as her first original Pop studio album in 8 years since I Stand, the album debuted at # 29 on the US Billboard 200. With the success of the album, Menzel embarked on a World Tour in 2017 that traveled to Asia, Europe, and North America. Menzel's concert stop in Las Vegas was recorded for her second live album entitled idina Live and released on October 12, 2018.

On March 12, 2018, it was announced that Menzel would join Josh Groban for his Bridges Tour. For this tour, she served as Groban's Opening act before joining him later during his set for 2 duets of Lullaby and Falling Slowly. Menzel only performed with Groban on the first leg of North America in various cities, including Atlanta, Nashville, Dallas, Phoenix, Chicago, Boston, Pittsburgh and a sold-out performance at New York's famed Madison Square Garden. The New York City show (entitled Bridges Live From Madison Square Garden) was also filmed and released in Movie Theaters & later a Live CD & DVD release with an airing on PBS.

On May 11, 2019, it was revealed that she had signed to Scooter Braun and SB Projects for music management. On October 18, 2019, Menzel released her second holiday album entitled Christmas: A Season of Love from School Boy and Decca Records on October 18, 2019. It debut at # 2 on Billboard's US Top Holiday Albums. In support of it, Menzel embarked on a three-city concert tour in the east coast including a sold-out return to New York's Carnegie Hall.

On October 11, 2022, Menzel announced on her Instagram page that she would be releasing a concert special on Disney+ on December 9 titled Idina Menzel: Which Way to the Stage?. The special will consist of concert footage from Madison Square Garden in New York. The title is a nod to Menzel's first line as Maureen in Rent.

Film and television career 
After minor roles in Kissing Jessica Stein and Just a Kiss, Menzel had supporting roles in The Tollbooth and Water in 2004. Her first major role in a major film was in 2005 when she reprised her role as Maureen Johnson in the film adaptation of Rent. She was nominated for several critics circle awards for the part.

In 2007, Menzel appeared in the musical romantic comedy film Enchanted as Nancy Tremaine, the fiancée of Patrick Dempsey's character Robert and Giselle's (Amy Adams) romantic rival. Despite being a musical, Menzel famously does not sing in the film; a duet songwriters Alan Menken and Stephen Schwartz had written for her character was ultimately not used. Menzel was offered the role without auditioning and was flattered that Disney cast her based solely on her acting abilities. Menzel explained that having her character sing would have made little sense narrative-wise, due to Nancy belonging to the reality-based New York world as opposed to the film's more fantastical characters. She opted to portray Nancy with vulnerability as opposed to "a typical mean girlfriend that everyone's going to hate." Enchanted was a critical and commercial success, but The Hollywood Reporter's Kirk Honeycutt accused the film of wasting Menzel's talent, while Jim Lane of the Sacramento News & Review felt the actress was underused. However, Screen Rant's Mel Hall found Menzel's performance compelling. Menzel reprised her role in the sequel Disenchanted released in 2022, in which her character sang for the first time. Menzel's "Love Power" released as the lead single from the Disenchanted soundtrack, in November 2022.

Menzel had a recurring guest star role in the television series Glee playing Shelby Corcoran, the coach of the rival glee club Vocal Adrenaline. When the series first premiered, Glee fans (known collectively as 'Gleeks') had noted a strong physical resemblance between Menzel and Lea Michele, who portrays the character of Rachel Berry. According to her then-husband, actor Taye Diggs, Menzel had expressed interest in possibly guest-starring as the biological mother of Rachel. The character was introduced in the episode "Hell-O". Lea Michele and Idina Menzel sing together "I Dreamed a Dream" from Les Misérables and "Poker Face" originally by Lady Gaga. Menzel returned to Glee in season 3 episode "I Am Unicorn", her role this time as a teacher causing trouble for Rachel, Quinn, Puck, and former flame Will Schuster.

In 2013, Menzel voiced Elsa, a young queen struggling with her magical ability to control ice and snow, in Disney's computer-animated musical film Frozen. After she failed to secure the lead role in Disney's Tangled (2010), the studio rediscovered Menzel's Tangled audition while casting Frozen, which Tangled's casting director had secretly recorded on her phone. Loosely based on the titular villain in Hans Christian Andersen's fairy tale "The Snow Queen", Menzel's character was re-written into a misunderstood heroine for Disney's adaptation, prompted by songwriters Kristen Anderson-Lopez and Robert Lopez's creation of her anthem "Let It Go". They wrote "Let it Go" with Menzel in mind due to its demanding vocal range. Released to critical acclaim, Frozen became the highest-grossing animated film at the time of its release, earning $1.27 billion worldwide. Film critics praised Menzel's performance, particularly her rendition of "Let It Go", which won the Academy Award for Best Original Song. The song became a global pop culture phenomenon, with several fans uploading covers and parodies to the internet. "Let It Go" was also a successful radio single; peaking at number five on the Billboard Hot 100, the song's placement made Menzel the first Tony Award-winning actor to earn a top-10 song on the chart. "Let it Go" ultimately became one of the best-selling songs of 2014, selling 10.9 million copies and out-performing Demi Lovato's pop version. Although Disney Music Group president Ken Bunt claims they had always intended to release Menzel's rendition as a single after Lovato's, the success of Menzel's version on pop radio was considered surprising due to its non-commercial sound. Menzel has since reprised her role of Elsa in most of her appearances including video games such as the Disney Infinity series and Kingdom Hearts III, the 2015 short film Frozen Fever, the 2017 featurette short film Olaf's Frozen Adventure, the 2018 film Ralph Breaks the Internet, and for the 2019 sequel Frozen II.

Menzel sang "Let it Go" live at the 86th Academy Awards in March 2014, where the song had been nominated for (and eventually won) the Academy Award for Best Original Song. Before her performance, actor John Travolta mispronounced her name as "Adele Dazeem" while introducing her to the stage, and the mispronunciation subsequently became a viral Internet meme. Menzel was not upset about the mispronunciation. In response to the misnaming, she reportedly printed up satirical playbills that promoted her name as Adele Dazeem, noting her past work in Nert (Rent), Wicked-ly (Wicked) and Farfignugen (a play on the word Fahrvergnügen, referring to Frozen). Three days after the ceremony, Travolta publicly apologized to Menzel for mispronouncing her name. At the 87th Academy Awards, Menzel presented the award for Best Original Song alongside Travolta where she jokingly introduced him as "Glom Gazingo". Travolta then finally pronounced her name correctly when he appeared on stage.

Menzel starred as C.C. Bloom in the Lifetime TV movie remake of the film Beaches, which aired on January 21, 2017.

She was announced to star on the Ellen DeGeneres-produced sitcom Happy Time, but, as of October 15, 2019, this project appears to have been shelved.

She starred alongside Adam Sandler playing his wife Dinah Ratner in the 2019 crime film Uncut Gems.

In 2021, Menzel co-starred alongside Camila Cabello, Billy Porter and James Corden in Kay Cannon's jukebox musical adaptation of the Cinderella fairy tale, playing Cinderella's stepmother Vivian. Despite admiring actresses who played the role prior, Menzel strove to eschew "the archetypal kind of idea of the straight-ahead evil nemesis" in favor of exploring the trauma behind the character's cruel nature. Menzel also wrote and recorded an original song for her character entitled "Dream Girl". Cinderella received mixed reviews upon release, but Menzel's performance was praised. Commending her chemistry with Cabello, IndieWire's Kristen Lopez said she plays the character "deliciously", while Richard Roeper of the Chicago Sun-Times described Menzel as "her usual spectacular self" and "arguably the most nuanced and empathetic 'evil' stepmother in 'Cinderella' history". Michael Calleri of the Niagara Gazette said Menzel delivers the film's best performance, writing she has enough talent "to give [her character's] banality a boost." She will also star in American Murderer directed by Matthew Gentile and You Are So Not Invited to my Bat Mitzvah directed by Sammi Cohen, with co-stars Adam Sandler and Sarah Sherman.

In 2022, Menzel  starred in an episode of the HGTV show Celebrity I.O.U. with the Property Brothers of Drew and Jonathan Scott. In this episode, she helped the brothers to renovate a garage for her friend James.

During the ongoing time of the COVID-19 pandemic, Menzel created and launched a brand new YouTube web series for children entitled Idina's Treehouse. The series featured Menzel from her treehouse out in her Los Angeles home that originally was built for her son Walker Nathaniel Diggs. It features a full set of songs, stories, and appearances from Menzel's family and friends.

Artistry

Voice and influences 

Menzel possesses a mezzo-soprano vocal range that spans approximately three octaves. For the Pittsburgh Post-Gazette, Sharon Eberson wrote that Menzel's voice "could be categorized as coquettish to flat-out belter and everything in between—and with a stage presence to match—she usually is labeled a mezzo-soprano. But why pigeonhole someone so intriguingly offbeat?" Eberson observed that she "interprets songs as much as an actress as a singer," believing, "therein lies her connection to the music and her fans." Describing Menzel as a loud soprano similar to Broadway actress Ethel Merman, Stephen Holden of The New York Times wrote "The sound she creates when she belts ... is a primal cry embedded in her being that insists that we listen and pay attention." Holden observed that her voice can alternate between "babyish and demanding, or it can sound grand and imperial" depending on the song choice. According to Andrew Gans of Playbill, Menzel has "one of the most unique voices of her generation, a pliable alto that can be sweet and girlish in its middle register and then easily soar to pop-influenced top notes way above high C." Frozen songwriter Kristen Anderson-Lopez described Menzel's voice as "a warm hug" with "this warmth and this vulnerability down low. And then, as you bring her higher and higher, she gets stronger and stronger, and more powerful. She just reaches into your soul when she’s singing these big, giant songs."

Menzel is known for her signature high belting style; The Kennedy Center website cites Menzel as a prime example of a "Broadway Belter" who uses the technique to her advantage. Theater critic Charles Isherwood said the singer "has a voice that is very much her own," describing it as "totally distinctive" with "a great belt and a great range." Describing Menzel's voice as "husky ... which sometimes veers toward shrieking until she effortlessly reins herself in or, amazingly, kicks it up another notch," Melissa Ruggieri of The Atlanta Journal-Constitution believes she possesses "a superior instrument" both live and in-studio. Explaining her own technique, Menzel said she avoids moving her shoulders while singing and prefers "to take a smaller breath for a bigger, longer note because there's less air that will come pummeling out." She also maintains her voice by constantly steaming and practicing vocal warm ups, describing her routine as "very ritualistic" and "disciplined". Despite her live vocals earning consistent acclaim, some critics have criticized Menzel's belting for sounding "screechy". Schuyler Velasco of The Christian Science Monitor observed that the singer "made a career out of belting notes that would fry the vocal chords of mere mortals", but felt the emotion of her performances sometimes suffers at the hands of her vocal proficiency. Velasco cited her rendition of "The Star-Spangled Banner" at Super Bowl XLIX as an example of Menzel sacrificing excitement and inspiration for technique, yet delivering an adequate performance nonetheless. Menzel addressed such criticisms during a 2014 concert, explaining that she wishes to sing loud, proud and "from the heart" like her idols Merman and Aretha Franklin. Tim Smith of The Baltimore Sun wrote that Menzel's "high-wattage vocal cords and intense phrasing ... [make] a mark whenever she sings." Menzel admits that she finds some of her most famous songs challenging, namely songs from the Frozen films, which "push her to vocal extremes" and require constant warming up and sometimes lowering the key for live performances. The term "powerhouse" has often been used in the media to describe Menzel's vocal ability.

Menzel's vocal style has drawn comparisons to singer Barbra Streisand, whose song "Don't Rain on My Parade" she often covers, including in tribute to her at the 2008 Kennedy Center Honors. Menzel said she had long aspired to have a career as successful as Streisand to whose Jewish upbringing Menzel has also been compared, with fans deeming her "the next big Jewish icon in music". Menzel was particularly inspired by Streisand's performance in the film A Star is Born (1976), and cites singers Franklin, Billie Holiday, Etta James, Chaka Khan and Sarah Vaughan among her vocal idols. Despite emulating her inspirations, Menzel claims she maintains the importance of "finding [her] own voice." Some critics have dubbed Menzel "the Streisand of her generation". Similar comparisons have been drawn between Menzel and singer Bette Midler.

Musical style 
Professionally trained as a classical singer from age eight, Menzel decided to pursue different genres such as R&B and jazz once she began high school. Upon becoming a wedding singer, Menzel was eventually exposed to a wide variety of musical genres, ranging from jazz to rock and Motown, and would often experiment with new arrangements of traditional songs. She credits her wedding singer background with training her to improvise new vocal arrangements, which in turn helps her ad-lib alternative versions of songs when she is feeling unwell or her voice is tired. Her set lists tend to incorporate an eclectic combination of original material and covers of popular pop, rock, musical theatre and film songs, selecting an assortment of songs she expects fans want to hear and feels inspired to attempt new interpretations of. Jay Handelman of the Sarasota Herald-Tribune opined that Menzel's song choices "reinforce her own offbeat personality." According to Menzel, her song selections usually indicate a milestone, choosing to convey a stories and memories about her life using music. Menzel often opts to perform barefoot in concert, which has become a trademark of her live performances. She also enjoys conversing with audience members in-between musical performances. In addition to her vocal prowess, Menzel has been noted for her charming and witty banter; Smith described her as "a pro at delivering stage banter and as quick on the draw with one-liners as seasoned stand-up comedians." On her stage presence, The Denver Post critic Ray Mark Rinaldi wrote that Menzel delivers "the kind of self-assurance that can only come from beating out Kristin Chenoweth for a Tony. She comes out on stage, dressed like she doesn’t care, acting a little dizzy, but knowing all along she’s gonna hit the right notes."

Menzel has become closely associated with songs about self-empowerment, specifically her Signature Songs "Defying Gravity" and "Let it Go". Discussing Disney author Amy M. Davis believes Menzel's voice "has become associated with rebellion for Broadway fans." However, the artist claims such themes have made her feel fraudulent at times because she herself does not always feel empowered. Subsequently, she began incorporating more emotional material into her sets, such as Radiohead's "Creep". Although Menzel co-writes most of her own material as a singer-songwriter, she considers herself a collaborator rather than a songwriter, explaining that she prefers working with professional songwriters or producers: "They start playing some music, and I like to sing… I can sing melodies, I come up with titles and lyrical ideas, but I’m really not good at making decisions." She has frequently collaborated with songwriter and producer Glen Ballard, and tends to draw upon lyrics from her personal diary and melodies from a tape recorder. Menzel claims she has never completed writing a song entirely on her own, finding the process to be too stressful: "I never had a good song that I wrote, so to ... act like I’m this great songwriter, I would be just a fraud. But, I’m good at bringing myself to it—being a good collaborator in the room.” She cites Joni Mitchell and Annie Lennox among her musical influences, describing them as "singer-songwriters who had these amazing voices but also were incredible storytellers and lyricists", while expressing admiration for musicians Bono, Sting and Seal. The Ithacan's Preston Arment observed that "what Menzel may lack in songwriting ability, she makes up for with stunning vocals that remind us why listeners will never stop loving her." AllMusic biographer Marcy Donelson described Menzel's studio albums as a combination of Adult Alternative, vocal, and contemporary pop music. Menzel's fifth studio album, which she considers to be her most personal to-date, contains a combination of ballads and upbeat tracks that explore themes about home, personal loss, empowerment, relationships and starting over, much of which was inspired by her divorce from Taye Diggs. Bailey Flynn of The Heights believes the album demonstrates several trademarks for which Menzel has become known: "power ballads that give her huge vocal range and mind-blowing control all the chance they need to show off."

Menzel described performing her own songs live as "scarier" than singing covers or songs from established shows because "You're a little bit more transparent. There's no costume or character I'm hiding behind ... yet sometimes it's more rewarding because of that", describing the feeling of hearing fans sing songs she has written herself as "incredible".

Legacy and public image 
Menzel is considered to be among the greatest Broadway performers of her generation, possessing one of the most recognized and sought-after singing voices in the industry. Her success on Broadway has earned her the honorific nickname "Queen of Broadway" from several media publications. In 2019, Oliver Jones of The New York Observer called her "one of the defining Broadway voices of our time". Jenny Singer of Glamour declared Menzel one of history's greatest musical theater vocalists, while Melina Gills of Tribeca Film described her as "an icon and one of the most celebrated presences on the singing stage". The Toronto Sun's Jim Slotek dubbed her "this generation's Broadway icon". In a 2020 retrospective, Cleveland.com's Troy L. Smith crowned Menzel the best vocalist of 2013, writing that "Let it Go" only cemented her legacy as "one of Broadway’s greatest stars of all time". The previous year, BroadwayWorld recognized Menzel as one of the decade's 10 most defining Broadway stars. Time Out ranked Menzel Broadway's 19th greatest female performer of all-time, recognizing that she established a "stratospheric reputation" based almost entirely on the popularity of only two roles: Rent and Wicked. Examining the endurance of "Defying Gravity" from Wicked, Vulture.com's Jackson McHenry attributes the song's popularity to Menzel's powerhouse vocals, believing few singers can service the ballad as successfully as Menzel.

Menzel's successful crossover from stage actress to television, film, and recording star have been discussed at length, with Redbook dubbing her "One of [Broadway's] biggest crossover success stories". Menzel's biography on Starz describes her as "a stage to screen success story" and "the type of star they really don't make anymore". Original Broadway cast recordings of Rent and If/Then, both albums prominently featuring Menzel as a soloist, debuted within the top-20 of the Billboard 200. In a 2014 article, Billboard wrote that Menzel's crossover success "bodes well for Broadway's would-be stars", while the popularity of "Let it Go" "kicked open the door for future composers of stage and screen". The St. Louis Post-Dispatch credits "Let it Go" (and Travolta's mispronunciation of her name at the Academy Awards) with re-establishing Menzel as a household name among fans across the theater, television, and film communities, arguably more-so than her stage credits did, while Hollywood.com said the film "cemented Idina’s transition from Broadway superstar to overall superstar". When Menzel returned to Broadway in 2014 after the success of Frozen, Suzy Evans of Billboard observed that audience response was more akin to that of a "rock star" than a stage actor. Menzel's fanbase has nicknamed themselves "Fanzels". In addition to her perceived authenticity, Isherwood attributes the artist's large following to the successes of Rent and Wicked: "two era-defying, hugely successful Broadway musicals". Toronto Star theatre critic Richard Ouzounian credits both shows with solidifying her reputation as one of the industry's "most dynamic musical theatre stars". According to The Salt Lake Tribune contributor Sheena McFarland, the artist has remained influential for over two decades, since her first appearance on Broadway. She has been described as "Broadway royalty", due to a combination of her successful stage career and voicing royalty in Disney media.

As an actress, Menzel has earned a reputation for playing misunderstood characters both on stage and in film, believing she gravitates towards more complex female roles. She acknowledged a combination of power and vulnerability as common theme among characters she has played. According to the Irish Independent, Menzel has become "a go-to actress for producers looking for a feisty female lead" based on her successes as Maureen, Elphaba and Elsa, while The Globe and Mail's Courtney Shea believes she "forged her career playing strong and sensational females". Menzel believes Broadway has always offered compelling roles for women of all ages, while Hollywood is much more susceptible to ageism and sexism. Menzel is largely viewed as a role model towards young women, particularly due to her role as Elsa which has earned her a large following among predominantly female Frozen fans. Although she takes her responsibility as a role model seriously, she has stated that she does not always feel like a role model in her personal life and feels uncomfortable bearing the responsibility at times. Diana Bunici of Evoke.ie dubbed Menzel "the voice of the new generation". In 2014, Menzel was awarded "Breakthrough Artist" by Billboard. "In November 2019, Menzel and actress Kristen Bell, who plays her sister in Frozen, received neighboring stars—Menzel's was the 2682nd and Bell's was the 2681st—on the Hollywood Walk of Fame. Menzel was inducted into the live theatre category. Menzel is also among the wealthiest Broadway performers, due in part to her television, film and music careers. In 2022, Menzel was announced as a recipient of a Disney Legends Award for her outstanding contributions to the Walt Disney Company.

In 2022, Menzel co-wrote a children's book with her sister, Cara Mentzel, called Loud Mouse with illustrations by Jaclyn Sinquett. The book is semi-autobiographical about a mouse named Dee who loves to sing loudly. The book was published by Disney-Hyperion on September 27, 2022. In promotion of the book, Menzel released "The Loud Mouse Song", which she co-wrote with Laura Veltz, on September 23, 2022.

Personal life 
Menzel married Taye Diggs on January 11, 2003. They met in 1995 during the original production of Rent, in which Diggs portrayed Benjamin Coffin III, the landlord. On September 2, 2009, she gave birth to their son. In late 2013, it was reported that Menzel and Diggs had separated after 10 years of marriage.

Menzel began dating actor Aaron Lohr, and in August 2015, they bought a home together in Encino, Los Angeles. On September 23, 2016, Menzel announced that she and Lohr were engaged. They were married over the weekend of September 22, 2017.

Menzel identifies as a feminist, saying, "I love that I play all of these strong women. But they're not just strong—they're women who have a really deep vulnerability and need to go through a journey in order to harness their power."

Philanthropy 
Menzel was an honorary chair of the Imperial Court of New York's Annual Charity Coronation Ball, Night of A Thousand Gowns, on March 21, 2009, sharing the title with Elton John, Patti LuPone, John Cameron Mitchell, Joan Rivers, and Robin Strasser.

On May 17, 2009, Menzel performed at a special benefit concert in Atlanta, Georgia, to raise money for the Pace Academy Diversity Program in coordination with the Ron Clark Academy. The event resulted in the funding of two scholarships for Ron Clark Academy students to attend Pace Academy. The event was organized and hosted by Philip McAdoo, a former Rent cast member and current Diversity Program Director at Pace Academy.

In 2010, Menzel founded the A BroaderWay Foundation with then-husband Taye Diggs as a means of supporting young people in the arts. A BroaderWay sponsors camp programs, theater workshops, and innovative educational programming, and offers scholarships and opportunities to experience professional performances. In Summer 2011, Camp BroaderWay welcomed girls from under-served metro New York communities to a 10-day performing arts camp, run by Menzel and a team of acclaimed professional Broadway artists including Taye Diggs. During this camp, the girls collaborated with Broadway artists to write an original musical that was performed at a theatre in New York. The camp was held at Belvoir Terrace Summer Camp in Lenox, Massachusetts.

Menzel has long-championed LGBT rights by partnering with organizations like The Trevor Project, the Give A Damn Campaign (filming a public service announcement and designing a T-shirt) and the NOH8 Campaign, posing for one of their trademark duct-taped silence photos.

In April 2014, Menzel presented at Broadway Cares/Equity Fights AIDS Easter Bonnet Competition with Bryan Cranston, Fran Drescher, and Denzel Washington, after raising donations at her Broadway show If/Then.

Filmography

Film

Television

Video games

Other

Discography 

 Still I Can't Be Still (1998)
 Here (2004)
 I Stand (2008)
 Holiday Wishes (2014)
 idina. (2016)
 Christmas: A Season of Love (2019)

Theatre and concerts

Theatre

Concerts

Other

Awards and nominations

Theater

Film

Television

Notes

References

External links 

 
 
 
 
 
 Interview with Idina Menzel at TonyAwards.com

 
1971 births
Living people
20th-century American actresses
20th-century American Jews
20th-century American singers
20th-century American composers
20th-century American women singers
20th-century women composers
21st-century American actresses
21st-century American Jews
21st-century American singers
21st-century American composers
21st-century American women singers
21st-century women composers
Activists from New York (state)
Actresses from New Jersey
Actresses from New York City
American feminists
American film actresses
American mezzo-sopranos
American musical theatre actresses
American people of Russian-Jewish descent
American television actresses
American video game actresses
American voice actresses
American women singer-songwriters
Audiobook narrators
Circle in the Square Theatre School alumni
Disney people
Feminist musicians
Hollywood Records artists
Jewish American actresses
Jewish American philanthropists
Jewish American songwriters
Jewish feminists
Jewish women singers
American LGBT rights activists
Participants in American reality television series
People from Marlboro Township, New Jersey
People from Syosset, New York
Philanthropists from New York (state)
Singers from New York City
Singer-songwriters from New Jersey
Singer-songwriters from New York (state)
Syosset High School alumni
Tisch School of the Arts alumni
Tony Award winners
Warner Records artists
Disney Legends